The Lifetime Achievement Award was first presented in 1994 to honor major long-term achievements in the fields of limnology and oceanography, including research, education and service to the community and society. In 2004, the Association for the Sciences of Limnology and Oceanography board renamed the award in honor of Alfred C. Redfield.

Recipients

Notes
The information in the table is according to the "A.C. Redfield Lifetime Achievement Award" webpage of the Association for the Sciences of Limnology and Oceanography unless otherwise specified by additional citations.

References

External links 
ASLO Awards and Nominations

Awards established in 1994
Science and technology awards
Lifetime achievement awards
1994 establishments in the United States